Súper Ratones (in English The Super Mice) is a musical group of Argentine rock and pop style from Mar del Plata and established in 1985.

History 
This group was born in the city of Mar del Plata in 1985 to José Luis "Person" Properzi (drums and vocals), Fernando Blanco (bass and vocals) and Oscar Granieri (guitar and vocals), and an additional guitarist named Juan Carlos Raising and called themselves simply Los Ratones (The Mice). In 1988, they were joined by guitarist Mario Barassi, being like a quartet stable. They won the award for revelation band Youth Festival and in 1988, the group added the final name: Súper Ratones. After five years of presentations by the coast, they signed a contract for the debut album, Rock Beach, which managed to be sold as gold.

On November 3, 2015, its founder and lead singer, José Luis "Person" Properzi, died of cancer at age 48 years old.

Musical style 
His music was strongly influenced by artistes of the 1950s and 1960s, such as Elvis Presley, Jerry Lee Lewis, The Beach Boys, The Beatles, Johnny Rivers, among others.

Discography

References

External links 

Argentine rock music groups
Argentine pop music groups
Argentine alternative rock groups
Musical groups established in 1985
People from Mar del Plata
1985 establishments in Argentina